The 1991 Mazda Classic was a women's tennis tournament played on outdoor hard courts at the La Costa Resort and Spa in San Diego, California in the United States that was part of Tier III of the 1991 WTA Tour. It was the 13th edition of the tournament and was held from July 29 through August 5, 1991. Fourth-seeded Jennifer Capriati won the singles title and earned $45,000 first-prize money.

It was the tournament's first year in La Costa after moving from the San Diego Tennis & Racquet Club. It was also Mazda's first year as sponsor after replacing Great American Bank, a San Diego-based institution that was in financial decline.

Finals

Singles
 Jennifer Capriati defeated  Monica Seles, 4–6, 6–1, 7–6(7–2)

Doubles
 Jill Hetherington /  Kathy Rinaldi defeated  Gigi Fernández /  Nathalie Tauziat, 6–4, 3–6, 6–2

References

External links
 ITF tournament edition details
 Tournament draws

Mazda Classic
Southern California Open
Mazda Classic
Mazda Classic
Mazda Classic
Mazda Classic